Farmhouses in Loosduinen near The Hague at Twilight is an oil painting created in 1883 by Vincent van Gogh.

See also
List of works by Vincent van Gogh

External links

Paintings by Vincent van Gogh
1883 paintings
Farming in art